Diogo Lima Calixto (born 26 January 1993), sometimes known as just Diogo or Calixto, is a Brazilian footballer who plays for Inter de Limeira as a left back.

Career statistics

References

External links

1993 births
Living people
People from Pindamonhangaba
Brazilian footballers
Association football defenders
Campeonato Brasileiro Série D players
Botafogo Futebol Clube (SP) players
Mirassol Futebol Clube players
Ituano FC players
Associação Atlética Internacional (Limeira) players
Footballers from São Paulo (state)